Anastasios Sapountzis (born 28 January 2002) is a Greek professional footballer who plays as a midfielder for Super League 2 club Olympiacos B.

Personal life
Sapountzis is the son of Antonis Sapountzis.

References

2002 births
Living people
Greek footballers
Super League Greece 2 players
Olympiacos F.C. players
Association football midfielders
Footballers from Edessa, Greece
Olympiacos F.C. B players
PAOK FC players